Edward Edwards may refer to:

Edward Edwards (actor) (living), American television and film actor
Edward Edwards (librarian) (1812–1886), British librarian, library historian, and biographer
Edward Edwards (musician) (1816–1897), Welsh musician and composer
Edward Edwards (painter) (1738–1806), English painter
Edward Edwards (priest) (c. 1726–1783), Welsh scholar and clergyman
Edward Edwards (Royal Navy officer) (1742–1815), British naval officer
Edward Edwards (serial killer) (1933–2011), convicted American serial killer
Edward Edwards (zoologist) (1803–1879), Welsh marine zoologist
Edward I. Edwards (1863–1931), American politician
Edward Livingston Edwards (1812–1894), Missouri lawyer, state legislator, journalist, and judge

See also
Eddie Edwards (disambiguation)
Edwin Edwards (disambiguation)
List of people with reduplicated names